"Mr. Natural" is a song by the Bee Gees, written by Barry and Robin Gibb. On 29 March 1974, it was released as a single and also released on the album of the same name in 1974. It was backed with a folk rock number "It Doesn't Matter Much to Me". The group's first single which was produced by Arif Mardin.

Background
The band had recorded "It Doesn't Matter Much to Me" and "Voices" on 4 January during sessions at IBC Studios, London. The group continued to record two more songs on 8 January including this track and "Had a Lot of Love Last Night" at Command Studios also in London. It was chosen as the first single and later became the title track of the album.

The song is an instance of Robin singing higher harmony to Barry's lower harmony.

Release
Released during a period in which The Bee Gees just had an album A Kick In The Head Is Worth Eight In The Pants rejected by their manager Robert Stigwood, "Mr. Natural" barely scraped the lower end of the Billboard Hot 100 climbing to #93 and #11 in Australia. The promotional video for this song was filmed in black and white, and was televised at 192 TV. It was regularly performed on the Mr. Natural tour in 1974. Footage of the performance in Melbourne, Australia of the song (Mr. Natural) also exists. On 25 February 1974, the Bee Gees made their appearance at The Mike Douglas Show but only as a playback, on that performance, the backing band members are Alan Kendall, Dennis Bryon and Geoff Westley. It was also performed at The Merv Griffin Show.

Reception
Cash Box said that "this incredibly delicious track by the chart veterans is their best ever" and that "spiced with a dash of rock, it is a totally unique excursion for them." Record World said that the song showcases "the ultimate in tight, tasty vocal harmonies."

Personnel
Robin Gibb — lead and harmony vocals (first verse and chorus)
Barry Gibb — lead and harmony vocals (second verse), acoustic guitar
Maurice Gibb — bass guitar, mellotron, harmony vocals
Alan Kendall — electric guitar
Dennis Bryon — drums
Geoff Westley — piano

Chart positions

Weekly charts

Year-end charts

References

1974 singles
1974 songs
Bee Gees songs
Songs written by Barry Gibb
Songs written by Maurice Gibb
Songs written by Robin Gibb
Song recordings produced by Arif Mardin
RSO Records singles